Lieutenant General  Percy Kirke (1684 – 1 January 1741) was a British Army officer who became colonel of the 2nd (The Queen's Royal) Regiment of Foot.

Military career
Kirke was commissioned as an ensign in Trelawny's Regiment in 1686. He was taken as a prisoner of war at the Battle of Almansa in April 1707 during the War of the Spanish Succession. He went on to be colonel of the 2nd (The Queen's Royal) Regiment of Foot in 1710.  As was usual at the time, this regiment was also named after its current colonel, from one of whom, Percy Kirke, it acquired its nickname Kirke's Lambs.

Kirke died on 1 January 1741 and was buried at Westminster Abbey.

References

Sources

1684 births
1741 deaths
British Army lieutenant generals
British Army personnel of the War of the Spanish Succession
Queen's Royal Regiment officers
Burials at Westminster Abbey
King's Own Royal Regiment officers